Prasophyllum flavum, commonly known as the yellow leek orchid, is a species of orchid endemic to eastern Australia. It has a single tubular, green leaf with only a short free section and up to fifty scented, yellowish-green flowers.

Description
The flowers are yellowish-green with the ovary pressed up against the flowering stem. As with others in the genus, the flowers are inverted so that the labellum is above the column rather than below it. Flowering occurs from October to January.

Taxonomy and naming
Prasophyllum flavum was first formally described in 1810 by Robert Brown and the description was published in Prodromus Florae Novae Hollandiae et Insulae Van Diemen. The specific epithet (flavum) is a Latin word meaning "yellow" or "golden-yellow''.

Distribution and habitat
The yellow leek orchid grows in moist, fertile soils in high-rainfall forests. It is found on the coast and ranges of New South Wales and in Victoria south-east Queensland and in Tasmania.

References

External links 
 
 

flavum
Flora of New South Wales
Flora of Queensland
Flora of Tasmania
Flora of Victoria (Australia)
Endemic orchids of Australia
Plants described in 1810